Moorey is a surname. Notable people with the surname include:

 Roger Moorey (1937–2004), British archaeologist
 Tony Moorey (born 1974), British radio programme manager

See also
 Morey (disambiguation)